Frank Dietrich (born 2 December 1959 in West Berlin) is a retired German footballer. He played as a centre forward.

Dietrich made a total of 50 appearances in the 2. Bundesliga during the 1980s for VfL Osnabrück, Tennis Borussia Berlin and Hertha BSC. During the season 1986/87 he also played one year in Switzerland for Martigny-Sports in the second tier NLB.

References

External links 
 

1959 births
Living people
Footballers from Berlin
German footballers
Association football forwards
2. Bundesliga players
Füchse Berlin Reinickendorf players
VfL Osnabrück players
Tennis Borussia Berlin players
Hertha BSC players
20th-century German people